Portway or Port Way may refer to:

Places in England 

 Portway, Worcestershire, a hamlet in Beoley parish, near Redditch

Roads in England 
Port Way, a Roman road between London and Weymouth
Portway, Bristol, a road from Bristol to Avonmouth
Portway Bristol F.C., a defunct football team
Portway park and ride
Portway Park and Ride railway station
Derbyshire Portway, an ancient track
H5 Portway, part of the grid road system in Milton Keynes

People 
Joshua Portway (born 1967), British artist and game designer
Thomas Portway (by 1524–1557), English politician